LM Wind Power (formerly LM Glasfiber) is a Danish multinational wind turbine rotor blades manufacturer and is a subsidiary of General Electric.

LM Wind Power has manufactured more than 175,000 blades since 1975.

History
LM Wind Power was founded in 1940, as Lunderskov Møbelfabrik (Lunderskov furniture factory) in the small town Lunderskov, Denmark. In 1952, they investigated the possibilities of commercial exploitation of glass fiber technology, which made them change their name to LM Glasfiber and abandon their original plan of manufacturing wooden furniture. It was not until 1978 they started making wind turbine blades.

On 11 June 2010, LM Wind Power took part in setting an aviation record. They commissioned the An-225 to carry the world's longest piece of air cargo, as it flew two new 42-meter wind turbine blades from their factory in Tianjin, China, to their test facility in Lunderskov, Denmark.

Organization

LM Wind Power employed approximately 4,505 employees worldwide at the end of 2014. The company is headquartered in Kolding, Denmark and has a global business office in Amsterdam, the Netherlands. LM Wind Power has built production facilities in the major wind energy markets – 13 locations in 8 countries (Denmark, Spain, United States, Canada, India, China, Poland and Brazil). In addition to this, the company has a global network of R&D Centres in Denmark, the Netherlands, and India.

Ownership
From 2001 until 2017, principal shareholders of LM Wind Power were the partnerships by Doughty Hanson & Co. Ltd., and LM was the world's largest independent blade supplier. In April 2017, LM Wind Power was acquired by GE Renewable Energy for an enterprise value of €1.5 billion. The acquisition allowed GE to export wind energy to global customers.

References

External links 
 , official website

Companies based in Kolding Municipality
Greater Grand Forks
Wind power
Danish brands
Danish companies established in 1940
2017 mergers and acquisitions
General Electric acquisitions
Multinational companies headquartered in Denmark